William Lindsay (Kentucky politician) (1835–1909) was a U.S. Senator from Kentucky from 1893 to 1901. Senator Lindsay may also refer to:

Jon Lindsay (born 1935), Texas State Senate
Richard P. Lindsay (1926–2010), Utah State Senate
Richard Lindsay (West Virginia politician) (fl. 2010s), West Virginia Senate
Robert B. Lindsay (1824–1902), Alabama State Senate

See also
Senator Lindsey (disambiguation)